In navigation, the course of a watercraft or aircraft is the cardinal direction in which the craft is to be steered. The course is to be distinguished from the heading, which is the direction where the watercraft's bow or the aircraft's nose is pointed.

Course, track, route and heading 

The path that a vessel follows over the ground is called a ground track, course made good or course over the ground. For an aircraft it is simply its track. The intended track is a  route. For ships and aircraft, routes are typically straight-line segments between waypoints. A navigator determines the bearing (the compass direction from the craft's current position) of the next waypoint. Because water currents or wind can cause a craft to drift off course, a navigator sets a course to steer that compensates for drift. The helmsman or pilot points the craft on a heading that corresponds to the course to steer. If the predicted drift is correct, then the craft's track will correspond to the planned course to the next waypoint. Course directions are specified in degrees from north, either true or magnetic. In aviation, north is usually expressed as 360°. Navigators used ordinal directions, instead of compass degrees, e.g. "northeast" instead of 45° until the mid-20th century when the use of degrees became prevalent.

See also 

 Acronyms and abbreviations in avionics
 Bearing (navigation)
 Breton plotter
 E6B
 Ground track
 Navigation
 Navigation room
 Rhumb line

Notes

References
Pilot's Handbook of Aeronautical Knowledge
glossary

Aircraft instruments
Navigation
Tracking
Air navigation